Parabolic geometry  may refer to:

 Parabolic geometry, former name for Euclidean geometry, a comprehensive and deductive mathematical system 

 Parabolic geometry (differential geometry): The homogeneous space defined by a semisimple Lie group modulo a parabolic subgroup, or the curved analog of such a space
 Cartan parabolic geometry, geometry induced by parabolic Cartan inclusions